Heptanthus is a genus of Cuban flowering plants in the sunflower family.

 Species
All the species are endemic to Cuba.

References

Asteraceae genera
Neurolaeneae
Flora of Cuba